Heidi Obrecht (born 6 May 1942) is a Swiss alpine skier. She competed in two events at the 1964 Winter Olympics.

References

1942 births
Living people
Swiss female alpine skiers
Olympic alpine skiers of Switzerland
Alpine skiers at the 1964 Winter Olympics
Sportspeople from Bern
Universiade gold medalists for Switzerland
Universiade bronze medalists for Switzerland
Universiade medalists in alpine skiing
Competitors at the 1964 Winter Universiade
Competitors at the 1966 Winter Universiade
Competitors at the 1968 Winter Universiade
20th-century Swiss women